Kharaju is a city and the capital of Saraju District, in Maragheh County, East Azerbaijan Province, Iran.

Kharaju may also refer to:

 Kharaju, Azarshahr, a village in Qebleh Daghi Rural District, Howmeh District, Azarshahr County, East Azerbaijan Province, Iran.

See also
 Kharajuz or Qareh Gowzlu, Zanjan, a village in Qoltuq Rural District, in the Central District of Zanjan County, Zanjan Province, Iran